Ballymote railway station serves the town of Ballymote in County Sligo, Ireland.

History
The station opened on 3 December 1862 with the Midland Great Western Railway extension from Longford to Sligo.

The current station building is listed and was believed to have been built around 1875.

A wall-mounted cast iron water fountain with the inscription "keep the pavement dry" was installed on the east platform around 1910.  It is of skilled craftsmanship and the inscription is unusual.

The passing loop was removed at some point between 1985 and 1993 with the track only serving the up platform.

There was also a goods depot, shed and goods yard that have since been demolished.

Accidents
On 2 August 1903, a double-headed passenger train for Sligo collided with the mail train for Dublin. Three passengers were injured. The investigation concluded the passenger train, whose main driver had been on shift for 20 hours, had gone through a stop signal resulting in a Collision - road incorrectly set.  The lead engine also did not have its braking system correctly connected to the main engine.

Awards
Ballymote was the winner of the National Best Station award in 2004.

Notable people
Albert Reynolds was an Irish Taoiseach who formerly worked in the CIE accountancy office at Ballymote dealing with the various accounts in the town sending or receiving goods by train.

Gallery

See also
 List of railway stations in Ireland

Notes and References

Notes

References

External links

Irish Rail Ballymote station website

Iarnród Éireann stations in County Sligo
Railway stations in County Sligo
Railway stations opened in 1862
1862 establishments in Ireland
Railway stations in the Republic of Ireland opened in the 19th century